Leonard Ford (b. 1953 – 30 September 2019), known professionally as Louie Rankin, was a Jamaican dancehall reggae artist and actor.

Life and career
Leonard Ford was born in Saint Thomas Parish, Jamaica and grew up in Rockfort and East Kingston. His most successful song was the single "Typewriter", released in 1992. In his lyrics, Rankin often referred to himself as the "Original Don Dada," a term used by many of his dancehall competitors, such as Super Cat. Rankin also performed notable acting roles as a Jamaican "gangsta", in the movies Shottas and Belly. He lived in Toronto, Ontario, Canada, and was considered "the real Jamaican Don Dada". Rankin was a member of the Screen Actors Guild.

Death
He died on 30 September 2019, in a car accident on Highway 89 near Shelburne, Ontario. He lived in Hanover, Ontario at the time of his death.

Filmography

References

External links
 

1953 births
2019 deaths
People from Saint Thomas Parish, Jamaica
Jamaican reggae musicians
Jamaican male film actors
Musicians from Kingston, Jamaica
21st-century Jamaican male actors
Road incident deaths in Canada
Accidental deaths in Ontario